Clarendon Road is a street in the Notting Hill district of London. It runs roughly south to north from Holland Park Avenue.

It is named after George Villiers, 4th Earl of Clarendon, who was Lord Privy Seal when the road was built.

The suffragists Emmeline Pankhurst and her daughter Christabel Pankhurst lived at no 50. A later resident, Mark Arnold-Forster, journalist and author, lived there until his death in 1981.

The author Arthur Machen (1863–1947) lived at no 23, and in the 1880s wrote of his life here in his memoirs Far Off Things (1922) and Things Near and Far (1923).

The Embassy of Tajikistan, London is at no 110.

In December 2022, it was reckoned to be the fifth most expensive street in England.

References

Notting Hill
Streets in the Royal Borough of Kensington and Chelsea